The ICW Zero-G Championship is a professional wrestling junior heavyweight championship owned by United Kingdom's Insane Championship Wrestling promotion. The title was first established as the Zero Gravity Championship at Fear & Loathing III  on 21 November 2011, with Noam Dar becoming the inaugural champion.

Title history 
Noam Dar was the inaugural champion. Kenny Williams and Mark Coffey tied for the most reigns at three. Liam Thomson's reign is the longest at 426 days, while Craig Anthony's reign is the shortest at less than a day.

Theo Doros is the current champion in his first reign. He defeated Daz Black for the title at Fear & Loathing XIV on November 20, 2022, in Glasgow, Scotland.

Reigns

Combined reigns 

See also
Insane Championship Wrestling
ICW World Heavyweight Championship
ICW Tag Team Championship
ICW Women's Championship

References

External links
ICW Zero-G Title History at Cagematch.net

Insane Championship Wrestling championships
Junior heavyweight wrestling championships